The Presidents: The Lives and Legacies of the 43 Leaders of the United States is a 3 DVD set documentary released in 2005 by The History Channel.

Description
As the title suggests, the documentary presents a snapshot of life from the White House since independence of the United States.  The documentary is based on the 2000 book To the Best of My Ability: The American Presidents, edited by James M. McPherson. Each DVD has three episodes. The documentary introduces each president with a bulletin card about his personality, and then proceeds to discuss political situation at the time, the turmoil and changes until the president's departure from office. The documentary details interesting stories like Thomas Jefferson's acquisition of Louisiana, Battle of the Petticoats, machinations of Rutherford Hayes, Civil War, Reagan's Revolution and many others.

DVD 1
 George Washington to James Monroe: 1789-1825
 John Quincy Adams to James K. Polk: 1825-1849
 Zachary Taylor to Abraham Lincoln: 1849-1865

DVD 2
 Andrew Johnson to Chester A. Arthur: 1865-1885
 Grover Cleveland to William Howard Taft: 1885-1913
 Woodrow Wilson to Franklin D. Roosevelt: 1913-1945

DVD 3
 Harry Truman to Gerald Ford: 1945-1977
 Jimmy Carter to George W. Bush: 1977–Present (2004 campaign)
 Bonus Program: All the Presidents' Wives

Re-aired, the final program includes the first term of Barack Obama, however, Edward Herrmann does not return as the narrator.

Credits
 Executive Producers : Craig Haffner and Donna E. Lusitana
 Producer: Susan Werbe
 Written and Produced by Rhys Thomas
 Narrator: Edward Herrmann

External links
 Amazon

Documentary films about American politics
Films about presidents of the United States
History (American TV channel) original programming